Fashion design is the art of applying design, aesthetics, clothing construction and natural beauty to clothing and its accessories. It is influenced by culture and different trends, and has varied over time and place. "A fashion designer creates clothing, including dresses, suits, pants, and skirts, and accessories like shoes and handbags, for consumers. He or she can specialize in clothing, accessory, or jewelry design, or may work in more than one of these areas."

Fashion designers
Fashion designers work in a variety of different ways when designing their pieces and accessories such as rings, bracelets, necklaces and earrings. Due to the time required to put a garment out in market, designers must anticipate changes to consumer desires. Fashion designers are responsible for creating looks for individual garments, involving shape, color, fabric, trimming, and more.

Designers conduct research on fashion trends and interpret them for their audience. Their specific designs are used by manufacturers. This is the essence of a designer's role; however, there is variation within this that is determined by the buying and merchandising approach. When thinking of product quality control budget retailers use inexpensive fabrics to have a quick turn around on production, but high-end retailers will ensure that the best available fabrics are used and lots of time is utilized.

Fashion designers attempt to design clothes which are functional as well as aesthetically pleasing. They consider who is likely to wear a garment and the situations in which it will be worn, and they work within a wide range of materials, colors, patterns and styles. Though most clothing worn for everyday wear falls within a narrow range of conventional styles, unusual garments are usually sought for special occasions such as evening wear or party dresses.

Some clothes are made specifically for an individual, as in the case of haute couture or bespoke tailoring. Today, most clothing is designed for the mass market, especially casual and every-day wear are called ready to wear or known as fast fashion.

Structure 
Fashion designers may work full-time for one fashion house, as 'in-house designers', which owns the designs, or they work alone or as part of a team. Freelance designers work for themselves, selling their designs to fashion houses, directly to shops, or to clothing manufacturers. Most fashion designers set up their own labels, under which their designs are marketed. While others are self-employed and design for individual clients. Other high-end fashion designers cater to specialty stores or high-end fashion department stores. These designers create original garments, as well as those that follow established fashion trends. Most fashion designers, however, work for apparel manufacturers, creating designs of men's, women's, and children's fashions for the mass market. Large designer brands which have a 'name' as their brand such as Abercrombie & Fitch, Justice, or Juicy are likely to be designed by a team of individual designers under the direction of a design director.

Designing a garment 
Fashion designers work in different ways. Some sketch their ideas on paper, while others drape fabric on a dress form, another term for mannequin. Some designers work along with certain apps that can help connect all ideas together and expand their thoughts on a design. When a designer is completely satisfied with the fit of the toile (or muslin), they will consult a professional pattern maker who then makes the finished, working version of the pattern out of card or via a computer program. Finally, a sample garment is made up and tested on a model to make sure it is an operational outfit. Fashion design is expressive, the designers create art that may be functional or non-functional.

History

Fashion design is generally considered to have started in the 19th century with Charles Frederick Worth who was the first designer to have his label sewn into the garments that he created. Before the former draper set up his maison couture (fashion house) in Paris, clothing design and creation was handled by largely anonymous seamstresses, and high fashion descended from that worn at royal courts. Worth's success was such that he was able to dictate to his customers what they should wear, instead of following their lead as earlier dressmakers had done. The term couturier was in fact first created in order to describe him. While all articles of clothing from any time period are studied by academics as costume design, only clothing created after 1858 is considered as fashion design.

It was during this period that many design houses began to hire artists to sketch or paint designs for garments. The images were shown to clients, which was much cheaper than producing an actual sample garment in the workroom. If the client liked their design, they ordered it and the resulting garment made money for the house. Thus, the tradition of designers sketching out garment designs instead of presenting completed garments on models to customers began as an economy.

Types of fashion
Garments produced by clothing manufacturers fall into three main categories, although these may be split up into additional, different types.

Haute couture

Until the 1950s, fashion clothing was predominately designed and manufactured on a made-to-measure or haute couture basis (French for high-sewing), with each garment being created for a specific client. A couture garment is made to order for an individual customer, and is usually made from high-quality, expensive fabric, sewn with extreme attention to detail and finish, often using time-consuming, hand-executed techniques. Look and fit take priority over the cost of materials and the time it takes to make. Due to the high cost of each garment, haute couture makes little direct profit for the fashion houses, but is important for prestige and publicity.

Ready-to-wear (prêt-à-porter)

Ready-to-wear, or prêt-à-porter, clothes are a cross between haute couture and mass market. They are not made for individual customers, but great care is taken in the choice and cut of the fabric. Clothes are made in small quantities to guarantee exclusivity, so they are rather expensive. Ready-to-wear collections are usually presented by fashion houses each season during a period known as Fashion Week. This takes place on a citywide basis and occurs twice a year. The main seasons of Fashion Week include: spring/summer, fall/winter, resort, swim, and bridal.

Half-way garments are an alternative to ready-to-wear, "off-the-peg", or prêt-à-porter fashion. Half-way garments are intentionally unfinished pieces of clothing that encourages co-design between the "primary designer" of the garment, and what would usually be considered, the passive "consumer". This differs from ready-to-wear fashion, as the consumer is able to participate in the process of making and co-designing their clothing.  During the Make{able} workshop, Hirscher and Niinimaki found that personal involvement in the garment-making process created a meaningful "narrative" for the user, which established a person-product attachment and increased the sentimental value of the final product.

Otto von Busch also explores half-way garments and fashion co-design in his thesis, "Fashion-able, Hacktivism and engaged Fashion Design".

Mass market

Currently, the fashion industry relies more on mass-market sales. The mass market caters for a wide range of customers, producing ready-to-wear garments using trends set by the famous names in fashion. They often wait around a season to make sure a style is going to catch on before producing their versions of the original look. To save money and time, they use cheaper fabrics and simpler production techniques which can easily be done by machines. The end product can, therefore, be sold much more cheaply.

There is a type of design called "kutch" originated from the German word kitschig, meaning "trashy" or "not aesthetically pleasing".  Kitsch can also refer to "wearing or displaying something that is therefore no longer in fashion".

Income 
Median annual wages for salaried fashion designers were $61,160 in May 2008. The middle 50 percent earned between $42,150 and $87,120.  The lowest 10 percent earned less than $32,150, and the highest 10 percent earned more than $124,780. Median annual earnings were $52,860 (£40,730.47) in apparel, piece goods, and notions - the industry employing the largest numbers of fashion designers.
,a fashion designer's median annual salary was $65,170. High end designers can earn around $92,550. In 2016, 23,800 people were counted as fashion designers in the United States.

Fashion industry

Fashion today is a global industry, and most major countries have a fashion industry. Seven countries have established an international reputation in fashion: the United States, France, Italy, United Kingdom, Japan, Germany and Belgium. The "big four" fashion capitals of the fashion industry are New York City, Paris, Milan, and London.

United States

The United States is home to the largest, wealthiest, and most multi-faceted fashion industry. Most fashion houses in the United States are based in New York City, with a high concentration centered in the Garment District neighborhood. On the US west coast, there is also to a lesser extent a significant number of fashion houses in Los Angeles, where a substantial percentage of high fashion clothing manufactured in the United States is actually made. Miami has also emerged as a new fashion hub, especially in regards to swimwear and other beach-oriented fashion. A semi-annual event held every February and September, New York Fashion Week is the oldest of the four major fashion weeks held throughout the world. Parsons The New School for Design, located in the Greenwich Village neighborhood of Lower Manhattan in New York City, is considered one of the top fashion schools in the world. There are numerous fashion magazines published in the United States and distributed to a global readership. Examples include Vogue, Harper’s Bazaar, and Cosmopolitan.

American fashion design is highly diverse, reflecting the enormous ethnic diversity of the population, but is largely dominated by a clean-cut, urban, hip aesthetic, and often favors a more casual style, reflecting the athletic, health-conscious lifestyles of the suburban and urban middle classes. The annual Met Gala ceremony in Manhattan is widely regarded as the world's most prestigious haute couture fashion event and is a venue where fashion designers and their creations are celebrated. Social media is also a place where fashion is presented most often. Some influencers are paid huge amounts of money to promote a product or clothing item, where the business hopes many viewers will buy the product off the back of the advertisement. Instagram is the most popular platform for advertising, but Facebook, Snapchat, Twitter and other platforms are also used. In New York, the LGBT fashion design community contributes very significantly to promulgating fashion trends, and drag celebrities have developed a profound influence upon New York Fashion Week.

Prominent American brands and designers include Calvin Klein, Ralph Lauren, Coach, Nike, Vans, Marc Jacobs, Tommy Hilfiger, DKNY, Tom Ford, Caswell-Massey, Michael Kors, Levi Strauss and Co., Estée Lauder, Revlon, Kate Spade, Alexander Wang, Vera Wang, Victoria’s Secret, Tiffany and Co., Converse, Oscar de la Renta, John Varvatos, Anna Sui, Prabal Gurung, Bill Blass, Halston, Carhartt, Brooks Brothers, Stuart Weitzman, Diane von Furstenberg, J. Crew, American Eagle Outfitters, Steve Madden, Abercrombie and Fitch, Juicy Couture, Thom Browne, Guess, Supreme, and The Timberland Company.

Belgium
In the late 1980s and early 1990s, Belgian fashion designers brought a new fashion image that mixed East and West, and brought a highly individualised, personal vision on fashion. Well known Belgian designers are the Antwerp Six: Ann Demeulemeester, Dries Van Noten, Dirk Bikkembergs, Dirk Van Saene, Walter Van Beirendonck and Marina Yee, as well as Maison Martin Margiela, Raf Simons, Kris Van Assche, Bruno Pieters, Anthony Vaccarello.

United Kingdom
London has long been the capital of the United Kingdom fashion industry and has a wide range of foreign designs which have integrated with modern British styles. Typical British design is smart but innovative yet recently has become more and more unconventional, fusing traditional styles with modern techniques. Vintage styles play an important role in the British fashion and styling industry. Stylists regularly 'mix and match' the old with the new, which gives British style a unique, bohemian aesthetic. Irish fashion (both design and styling) is also heavily influenced by fashion trends from Britain. Well-known British designers include Thomas Burberry, Alfred Dunhill, Paul Smith, Vivienne Westwood, Stella McCartney, John Galliano, John Richmond, Alexander McQueen, Matthew Williamson, Gareth Pugh, and Hussein Chalayan.

France

Most French fashion houses are in Paris, which is the capital of French fashion. Traditionally, French fashion is chic and stylish, defined by its sophistication, cut, and smart accessories. French fashion is internationally acclaimed.

Spain
Madrid and Barcelona are the main fashion centers in Spain. Spanish fashion is often more conservative and traditional but also more 'timeless' than other fashion cultures. Spaniards are known not to take great risks when dressing. Nonetheless, many are the fashion brands and designers coming from Spain.

The most notable luxury houses are Loewe and Balenciaga. Famous designers include Manolo Blahnik, Elio Berhanyer, Cristóbal Balenciaga, Paco Rabanne, Adolfo Domínguez, Manuel Pertegaz, Jesús del Pozo, Felipe Varela and Agatha Ruiz de la Prada.

Spain is also home to large fashion brands such as Zara, Massimo Dutti, Bershka, Pull&Bear, Mango, Desigual, Pepe Jeans and Camper.

Germany

Berlin is the centre of fashion in Germany (prominently displayed at Berlin Fashion Week), while Düsseldorf holds Europe's largest fashion trade fairs with Igedo. Other important centres of the scene are Munich, Hamburg, and Cologne. German fashion is known for its elegant lines as well as unconventional young designs and the great variety of styles.

Italy

Milan is Italy's fashion capital. Most of the older Italian couturiers are in Rome. However, Milan and Florence are the Italian fashion capitals, and it is the exhibition venue for their collections. Italian fashion features casual and glamorous elegance. In Italy Milan Fashion week takes places twices a week in February and September. Milan Fashion week puts fashion in the spotlight and celebrates it in the heart of Milan with fashion lovers, buyers and media.

Japan
Most Japanese fashion houses are in Tokyo. The Japanese look is loose and unstructured (often resulting from complicated cutting), colours tend to the sombre and subtle, and richly textured fabrics. Famous Japanese designers include Kenzo Takada, Issey Miyake, Yohji Yamamoto and Rei Kawakubo.

China
Hong Kong clothing brand Shanghai Tang's design concept is inspired by Chinese clothing and set out to rejuvenate Chinese fashion of the 1920s and 30s, with a modern twist of the 21st century and its usage of bright colours.

Soviet Union

Fashion in the Soviet Union largely followed general trends of the Western world. However, the state's socialist ideology consistently moderated and influenced these trends. In addition, shortages of consumer goods meant that the general public did not have ready access to pre-made fashion.

Switzerland
Most of the Swiss fashion houses are in Zürich.  The Swiss look is casual elegant and luxurious with a slight touch of quirkiness. Additionally, it has been greatly influenced by the dance club scene.

Mexico 
In the development of Mexican indigenous dress, the fabrication was determined by the materials and resources that are available in specific regions, impacting the "fabric, shape and construction of a people's clothing". Textiles were created from plant fibers including cotton and agave. Class status differentiated what fabric was worn. Mexican dress was influenced by geometric shapes to create the silhouettes. Huipil a blouse characterized by a "loose, sleeveless tunic made of two or three joined webs of cloth sewn lengthwise" is an important historical garment, often seen today. After the Spanish Conquest, traditional Mexican clothing shifted to take a Spanish resemblance.

Mexican indigenous groups rely on specific embroidery and colors to differentiate themselves from each other.

Mexican Pink is a significant color to the identity of Mexican art and design and general spirit. The term "Rosa Mexicano" as described by Ramón Valdiosera was established by prominent figures such as Dolores del Río and designer Ramón Val in New York.

When newspapers and magazines such as El Imparcial and El Mundo Ilustrado circulated in Mexico, became a significant movement, as it informed the large cities, such as Mexico City, of European fashions. This encouraged the founding of department stores, changing the existent pace of fashion. With access to European fashion and dress, those with high social status relied on adopting those elements to distinguish themselves from the rest. Juana Catarina Romero was a successful entrepreneur and pioneer in this movement.

Fashion design terms

 A fashion designer conceives garment combinations of line, proportion, color, and texture. While sewing and pattern-making skills are beneficial, they are not a pre-requisite of successful fashion design. Most fashion designers are formally trained or apprenticed.
 A technical designer works with the design team and the factories overseas to ensure correct garment construction, appropriate fabric choices and a good fit. The technical designer fits the garment samples on a fit model, and decides which fit and construction changes to make before mass-producing the garment.
 A pattern maker (also referred as pattern master or pattern cutter) drafts the shapes and sizes of a garment's pieces. This may be done manually with paper and measuring tools or by using a CAD computer software program. Another method is to drape fabric directly onto a dress form. The resulting pattern pieces can be constructed to produce the intended design of the garment and required size. Formal training is usually required for working as a pattern marker.
 A tailor makes custom designed garments made to the client's measure; especially suits (coat and trousers, jacket and skirt, et cetera). Tailors usually undergo an apprenticeship or other formal training.
 A textile designer designs fabric weaves and prints for clothes and furnishings. Most textile designers are formally trained as apprentices and in school.
 A stylist co-ordinates the clothes, jewelry, and accessories used in fashion photography and catwalk presentations. A stylist may also work with an individual client to design a coordinated wardrobe of garments. Many stylists are trained in fashion design, the history of fashion, and historical costume, and have a high level of expertise in the current fashion market and future market trends. However, some simply have a strong aesthetic sense for pulling great looks together.
 A fashion buyer selects and buys the mix of clothing available in retail shops, department stores, and chain stores. Most fashion buyers are trained in business and/or fashion studies.
 A seamstress sews ready-to-wear or mass-produced clothing by hand or with a sewing machine, either in a garment shop or as a sewing machine operator in a factory. She (or he) may not have the skills to make (design and cut) the garments, or to fit them on a model.
 A dressmaker specializes in custom-made women's clothes: day, cocktail, and evening dresses, business clothes and suits, trousseaus, sports clothes, and lingerie.
 A fashion forecaster predicts what colours, styles and shapes will be popular ("on-trend") before the garments are on sale in stores.
 A model wears and displays clothes at fashion shows and in photographs.
 A fit model aids the fashion designer by wearing and commenting on the fit of clothes during their design and pre-manufacture. Fit models need to be a particular size for this purpose.
 A fashion journalist writes fashion articles describing the garments presented or fashion trends, for magazines or newspapers.
 A fashion photographer produces photographs about garments and other fashion items along with models and stylists for magazines or advertising agencies.

See also

 Fashion
 Fashion design copyright
 History of western fashion
 List of fashion designers
 List of fashion education programs
 List of fashion topics
 Runway (fashion)
 Sustainable fashion
 Textile design
 Western dress codes

References

Bibliography
 Breward, Christopher, The culture of fashion: a new history of fashionable dress, Manchester: Manchester University Press, 2003, 
 Hollander, Anne, Seeing through clothes, Berkeley: University of California Press, 1993, 
 Hollander, Anne, Sex and suits: the evolution of modern dress, New York: Knopf, 1994, 
 Hollander, Anne, Feeding the eye: essays, New York: Farrar, Straus, and Giroux, 1999, 
 Hollander, Anne, Fabric of vision: dress and drapery in painting, London: National Gallery, 2002, 
 Kawamura, Yuniya, Fashion-ology: an introduction to Fashion Studies, Oxford and New York: Berg, 2005, 
 Lipovetsky, Gilles (translated by Catherine Porter), The empire of fashion: dressing modern democracy, Woodstock: Princeton University Press, 2002, 
 McDermott, Kathleen, Style for all: why fashion, invented by kings, now belongs to all of us (An illustrated history), 2010,  — Many hand-drawn color illustrations, extensive annotated bibliography and reading guide
Mckay Rosenberg, Dawn, Fashion designer job description: Salary, skills, & more. Retrieved May 10, 2021, from https://www.thebalancecareers.com/fashion-designer-526016
 Perrot, Philippe (translated by Richard Bienvenu), Fashioning the bourgeoisie: a history of clothing in the nineteenth century, Princeton NJ: Princeton University Press, 1994, 
 Steele, Valerie, Paris fashion: a cultural history, (2. ed., rev. and updated), Oxford: Berg, 1998, 
 Steele, Valerie, Fifty years of fashion: new look to now, New Haven: Yale University Press, 2000, 
 Steele, Valerie, Encyclopedia of clothing and fashion, Detroit: Thomson Gale, 2005
Strijbos, Bram. (2021, May 10). All the news about Milan Fashion week on FashionUnited. Retrieved May 10, 2021, from https://fashionweekweb.com/milan-fashion-week
Sterlacci, Francesca. (n.d.). What is a fashion designer? Retrieved May 10, 2021, from https://fashion-history.lovetoknow.com/fashion-clothing-industry/what-is-fashion-designer

 
Design occupations
Arts occupations